Alex Gerko (born 3 December 1979) is a Russian-born financial trader and founder of XTX Markets. He has a PhD from Moscow State University. In January 2023, he was named as the UK's largest tax payer.

References 

Currency traders
Moscow State University alumni
New Economic School alumni
British billionaires
Living people
Russian businesspeople in the United Kingdom
People who lost Russian citizenship